Piame is a Sepik language of northern Papua New Guinea. Speakers did not make contact with the outside world until 1982.

References

Sepik Hill languages
Languages of East Sepik Province